John O. Barnum (October 6, 1911 – October 30, 1996) was an American professional golfer who played on the PGA Tour in the 1950s and 1960s.

Barnum is notable for two significant milestones in golf. He was the second golfer (after Jim Barnes), and one of only seven, ever to win a PGA Tour event after turning 50, and the only player to win his first PGA Tour event past the age of 50.  His best finish in a major was T-16 at the 1958 PGA Championship.

Barnum won five Michigan PGA Senior titles, and was runner-up three times in the PGA Seniors' Championship (1963, 1964, 1966). He was inducted into the Grand Rapids Sports Hall of Fame in 1972, and elected to the Michigan Golf Hall of Fame in 1984.

Amateur wins (2)
1939 Mexican Amateur
1940 Mexican Amateur

Professional wins (10)

PGA Tour wins (1)

Other wins (8)
1950 Michigan Open
1957 Michigan PGA Championship
1958 Michigan Open, Michigan PGA Championship
1960 Michigan Open
1961 Michigan Open, Michigan PGA Championship
1963 Jamaica Open

Senior wins (1)
Five Michigan PGA Senior Championships

References

American male golfers
PGA Tour golfers
Golfers from Michigan
Sportspeople from Grand Rapids, Michigan
1911 births
1996 deaths